Campaspe was a supposed mistress of Alexander the Great.

Campaspe may also refer to:

Arts 
 Campaspe (play) (c. 1584)

Events 
 Campaspe Plains massacre (1839)

Places 
 Campaspe, Queensland (Australia)
 Campaspe River (Queensland, Australia)
 Campaspe River (Victoria, Australia)
 Shire of Campaspe (Victoria, Australia)

See also 
 Campaspero - a region in Spain